Gairdner's shrewmouse (Mus pahari) is a species of rodent in the family Muridae found in China, India, Laos, Myanmar, Thailand, and Vietnam.

References

Mus (rodent)
Rodents of India
Mammals described in 1916
Taxa named by Oldfield Thomas
Taxonomy articles created by Polbot